Mister Leather Europe (MLE) is a pan-European contest of leathermen held annually around October in Europe, organized by the European Confederation of Motorsport Club (ECMC) and hosted each year by a different member club.

The first known contest was held in 1985 in Hamburg, Germany; the winner was David Riseborough, Sweden.

MLE contestants must either be the winner of a local or regional ECMC club leather contest. Winners are usually sponsored to attend the International Mister Leather contest in Chicago the following May.

MLE contest format

The contest take place during the ECMC AGM, the Annual General Meeting (AGM) of ECMC clubs, hosted each year by a different club. 
The AGM weekend program schedules:

Friday:
 welcome party (with contestants introduction);
Saturday
 (afternoon) Conference of the ECMC clubs;
 (night) Gala Dinner;
 (night) Mister Leather Europe Contest;
Sunday
 (morning) Farewell Brunch

Usually, as in 2009 to 2011, the contest is composed of two rounds:

1. On stage interview and appearance.

2. Fetish show

Scoring
Scoring varies from year to year and is decided by the host club.

Generally there is an aggregate score from the judges and the audience.

For 2013, the host club, Leather Friends Italia announced:-

1. The Jury of judges will represent two thirds of the ballot; the public will represent one third of the
ballot.
2. The jury is composed by the judges invited at the sole discretion of the organizing club of the
ECMC Annual General Meeting, i.e. Leather Friends Italia.
3. Mister Leather Europe 2012, the ECMC Secretary and the Presidents of each club physically
present at the ECMC AGM will be invited to be judges in the Jury. A President can delegate his role as a
judge to another person of his own club only. The judges will be invited immediately as jury members
after registration of their club for the ECMC AGM.

MLE contest winners

See also

Leather Archives and Museum
Leather subculture
LGBT culture
International Mister Leather
International Ms. Leather

References

External links
ECMC official Website
Mister Leather Europe 2009 Contest Video

Leather events
Annual events in Europe
Recurring events established in 1985
1985 establishments in Sweden